Urszula Grabowska-Ochalik (born 27 June 1976) is a Polish film and television actress. She has appeared in such films as Joanna and Carte Blanche as well as the television series  Jeziorak as well as the television series Na krawedzi and Recipe for Life.

Grabowska was born in Myslenice.

External links
 

1976 births
Living people
Polish television actresses
Actresses from Warsaw